During the Korean Wave (Hallyu), K-pop artists took their concerts outside of South Korea, and with increased exposure, becoming a huge success in other Asian countries. Soon after, record label companies started experimenting expanding into the western music markets outside Asia. The word "Hallyu" (韓流; 한류) first originated in China during the 1990s by journalists that were surprised with how rapid Korean music had spread throughout China.

One study that examined the number of concerts held during the 2010s indicated that East and Southeast Asia had the most concerts, with North America and to a lesser extent Europe showing some consistent growth. Nevertheless, Asia remains a priority for K-pop artists when hosting concerts due to cultural similarities, lesser expenditures, distance and its established and strong patronage. The top three Asian countries with the most concerts were China, Japan, and Singapore. Korean artistes would also often release music in Chinese or Japanese which they would subsequently perform in other Asian countries.

The study also found that most tours were those of male groups, with solo acts and female groups coming in second. The top touring acts were BTS, Big Bang, Super Junior, 2PM, TVXQ, Shinee, Exo, Girls' Generation, F.T. Island, CNBLUE, Xia, Infinite and B1A4; with Xia the top solo act and IU the top female solo act.

This is a list of all notable K-pop concerts held outside the Asian continent.

2006–2009

2010

2011

2012

2013

2014

2015

2016

2017

2018

2019

2020

2021

2022

2023

Recurring

See also 

 Billboard K-Town
 List of K-pop artists
 List of K-pop on the Billboard charts
 List of South Korean idol groups
 List of J-pop concerts held outside Asia

References

list
Lists of concerts and performances by location
South Korean music-related lists